Apart from France, established Jewish populations exist in the Netherlands, Belgium, Italy and Switzerland. With the original medieval populations wiped out by the Black Death and the pogroms that followed it, the current Dutch and Belgian communities originate in the Jewish expulsion from Spain and Portugal, while a Swiss community was only established after emancipation in 1874. However, the vast majority of the population in the Netherlands and a large proportion of the one in Belgium were murdered in the Holocaust, and much of the modern Jewish population of these countries (as well as of Switzerland) derives from post-Holocaust arrivals from other parts of Europe. Here is a list of some prominent Jews in western Europe, arranged by country of origin.

Austria

Belgium
 Natanel Yatziv, number one athlete in Belgium (Belgian born)
Charles Trau (born 2 August 2002)
 Chantal Akerman (6 June 1950 – 5 October 2015), director-screenwriter
 Zora Arkus-Duntov, father of the Chevrolet Corvette (Belgian-born)
 Gérard Blitz, Olympic water polo medallist, co-founder of Club Med
 Gérard Blitz, Olympic swimming and water polo medalist
 Maurice Blitz, Olympic water polo medalist
 Henri Cohen, Olympic water polo medallist
 François Englert, Nobel Prize laureate in theoretical physics 
 Leopold Flam, philosopher
 Louis Frank, politician
 Diane von Fürstenberg, fashion designer
 Jean Gol, politician
 Nico Gunzburg, professor
 Asriel Günzig, rabbi
 Camille Gutt, finance minister; head of the International Monetary Fund
 Paul Hymans, liberal leader; president of the League of Nations
 René Kalisky, writer
 Julien Klener, linguist
 George Koltanowski, chess player
 Claude Lévi-Strauss, anthropologist (Belgian-born; atheist of Jewish descent)
 Alfred Loewenstein, financier (Jewish mother)
 Ernest Mandel, marxist theorist
 Bob Mendes, writer (Jewish father)
 Ralph Miliband, political scientist
 Jacques Ochs, Olympic fencing medalist
 Chaïm Perelman, philosopher (Polish-born)
 Ilya Prigogine, chemist (Russian-born), Nobel Prize (1977)
 Gaston Salmon, Olympic fencing medalist
 Henry Spira, animal rights activist
 Elias M. Stein, mathematician (Belgian-born)
 Marc Schlomo Jizchak Stern, Orthodox rabbi, cantor (de)
 Gilbert Stork, chemist
 Olivier Strelli, fashion designer
 Samy Szlingerbaum, film director, writer, and actor
 Guy Lee Thys, film director (Jewish mother)
 Raymond van het Groenewoud, singer-songwriter (Jewish mother)
 Sandra Wasserman, tennis player

France

Ireland

Italy

Political figures
 Alessandro d'Ancona (1835–1914), Senator and mayor of Pisa (1906–1907)
 Graziadio Isaia Ascoli (1829–1907), linguist and Senator (1886–1890)
 Luca Barbareschi (born in 1956), actor, director and former member of the Chamber of Deputies (2008–2013)
 Emanuele Fiano (born 1963), member of the Chamber of Deputies since 2006
 Giovanni Cantoni (1818–1897), physicist, member of the Chamber of Deputies (1867–1874) and Senator (1876–1880)
 Furio Colombo (born in 1931), journalist, member of the Chamber of Deputies (1996–2001, 2008–2013) and Senator (2006–2008)
 Luigi Cremona (1830–1903), mathematician, Senator (1879–1903) and Minister of Public Education (1898–1899)
 Giuliano Ferrara, (born in 1952), Minister for Parliamentary Relations (1994–1995), member of European Parliament (1989–1994), journalist and founder of Il Foglio
 Aldo Finzi (1891–1944), fascist member of the Chamber of Deputies (1921–1929)
 Giuseppe Finzi (1815–1886), patriot and Senator (1860–1886)
 Vittorio Foa (1910–2008), socialist trade unionist
 Alessandro Fortis (1842–1909), Italian Prime Minister (1905–1906)
 Augusto Graziani (1933–2014), economist and Senator (1992–1994)
 Yoram Gutgeld (born 1959), economist and former member of Chamber of Deputies (2013–2018)
 Anna Kuliscioff (1857–1925), Russian-born revolutionary feminist
 Rita Levi-Montalcini (1909–2012), scientist and Senator (2001–2012)
 David Levi (1816–1898), poet, patriot and Senator (1861–1880)
 Luigi Luzzatti (1841–1927), Italian Prime Minister (1910–1911)
 Ernesto Nathan (1848–1921), mayor of Rome (1907–1913)
 Margherita Sarfatti (1880–1961), journalist and mistress of Benito Mussolini
Liliana Segre (born 1930), holocaust survivor and Senator for life since 2018
 Sidney Sonnino (1847–1922), Italian prime minister (1906, 1909–1910)
 Umberto Terracini (1895–1983), President of the Constituent Assembly of Italy (1946–1948), Senator (1948–1983)
 Claudio Treves (1869–1933), politician and writer, grandfather of Carlo Levi
 Leone Wollemborg (1859–1932), politician and former Minister of Economy

Religious and communal leaders
 Samuel Aboab (1610–1694), prominent rabbi
 Aaron ben Gershon abu Al-Rabi or Aronne Abulrabi of Catania (ca. 1400–1450), rabbinic scholar, cabalist and astrologer; called also Aldabi or Alrabi, Aaron was "the first Jew in the history to be invited during a Pontificate to discuss freely and without censorship about religious subjects and papal perplexities; Pope Martin V welcomed him in Rome
 Barbara Aiello, American-born rabbi active in Italy
 Benjamin Artom (1835–1879), Haham of the Spanish and Portuguese Jews of Great Britain
 Umberto Cassuto (1883–1951), rabbi
 Abraham Isaac Castello (1726–1789), rabbi
 Leone Ebreo (1465–1523), Neoplatonic philosopher
 Amos Luzzatto (1928–2020), writer and former president of the Italian Jewish Communities Union
 Moshe Chaim Luzzatto (1707–1746), rabbi, scholar, mystic, also known as Ramchal
 Samuel David Luzzatto (1800–1865), important rabbi and scholar, also known as Shadal
 Raphael Meldola (1754–1828), rabbi
 David Nieto (1654–1728), rabbi
 Riccardo Pacifici (1904–1943), rabbi, murdered in Auschwitz
 Joseph Pardo (1561–1619), rabbi
 Obadiah ben Jacob Sforno (1475–1550), rabbi, philosopher
 Elio Toaff (1915–2015), rabbi and former Chief of Italian Jews Community
 Isaiah di Trani (ca. 1180–1250), talmudist, rabbi, also known as RID

Academics
 Pedigree of Azzopardi
 Faraj ben Salim, Sicilian physician and translator from Agrigento
 Mosé Bonavoglia de' Medici, or Bonavoglio de' Medici (died 1447), Sicilian physician from Messina and Dienchelele (Naggid or Dayan kelali = Universal Judge of Sicilian Jews); his Hebrew name was Moses Hefez
 Michele Besso (1873–1955), Swiss-born engineer
 Caecilius of Calacte, Sicilian rhetorician from modern Caronìa
 Laura Capón (1907–1977), physicist
 Enrico Castelnuovo, art historian and medievalist
 Gino Fano (1871–1952), mathematician
 Robert Fano (1917–2016), physicist
 Ugo Fano (1912–2001), physicist
 Carlo Ginzburg (born 1939), historian
 Giovanni Jona-Lasinio (born 1932), physicist (Jewish father)
 Alberto Jori (born 1965), philosopher (Jewish mother)
 Giorgio Levi Della Vida (1886–1961), linguist specialized in Semitic languages
 Rita Levi-Montalcini (1909–2012), neurologist, Nobel Prize (1986)
 Cesare Lombroso (1835–1909), criminologist
 Salvador Luria (1912–1991), microbiologist, Nobel Prize (1969)
 Samuel David Luzzatto (1800–1865), scholar and poet
 Franco Modigliani (1918–2003), economist, Nobel Prize (1985)
 Arnaldo Momigliano (1908–1987), Italian-born historian
 Bruno Pontecorvo (1913–1993), physicist
 Guido Pontecorvo (1907–1999), geneticist
 Giulio Racah (1909–1965), physicist
 Bruno Rossi (1905–1993), astrophysicist
 Asher Salah (born 1967), historian
 Cesare Segre (1928–2014), linguistics, semiotics
 Emilio Segrè (1905–1989), physicist, Nobel Prize (1959)
 pedigree of Sforno
 Piero Sraffa (1898–1983), economist
 Manfredo Tafuri (1935–1994), architectural historian, critic and theorist
 Ariel Toaff (born 1942), historian
 Andrew Viterbi (born 1935), inventor of the Viterbi algorithm
 Bruno Zevi (1918–2000), architectural critic and historian

Mathematicians
 Emilio Artom (1888–1952), mathematician
 Eugenio Calabi (born 1923), mathematician
 Guido Castelnuovo (1865–1952), mathematician
 Federigo Enriques (1871–1946), mathematician
 Gino Fano (1871–1952), mathematician
 Guido Fubini (1879–1943), mathematician
 Beppo Levi (1875–1961), mathematician
 Tullio Levi-Civita (1873–1941), mathematician
 Beniamino Segre (1903–1977), mathematician
 Corrado Segre (1863–1924), mathematician
 Vito Volterra (1860–1940), mathematician

Musicians
 Mario Ancona (1860–1931), baritone
 Abramo Basevi (1818–1885), composer and musician
 Alvise Bassano, musician
 Anthony Bassano, musician
 Baptista Bassano, musician
 Jeronimo Bassano, musician
 Haim Cipriani (born 1961), violinist and reform rabbi
 Mario Castelnuovo-Tedesco (1895–1968), guitar, classical and synagogal music composer
 Giacobbe Cervetto (1680–1783), cellist and composer
 Lorenzo Da Ponte (born Emanuele Conegliano, 1749–1838), opera librettist (born Jewish, raised Catholic)
 Abramo dall'Arpa (died 1566), harpist
 Abramino dall'Arpa (fl ca. 1577–1593), harpist
 Aldo Finzi (1897–1945), composer
 Obadiah the Proselyte, musician
 Salamone Rossi (ca. 1570–1630), baroque composer
 Victor de Sabata (1892–1967), conductor (Jewish mother)
 Leone Sinigaglia (1868–1944), composer

Writers
 Devorà Ascarelli, poet and translator
 Giorgio Bassani, author
 Angela Bianchini, fiction writer
 Riccardo Calimani, fiction writer and historian
 Enrico Castelnuovo, father of Guido
 Moses Chayyim Catalan, poet
 Lorenzo Da Ponte (born Emanuele Conegliano), opera librettist (born Jewish, raised Catholic)
 Leonardo de Benedetti, physician and writer
 Manuela Dviri, writer
 Alain Elkann, writer and journalist, father of John, Lapo and Ginevra
 Carlo Ginzburg, historian, writer, essayist and pioneer of microhistory
 Leone Ginzburg, writer (born in Ukraine)
 Natalia Ginzburg (born Levi), author (Jewish father), wife of Leone and mother of Carlo
 Arrigo Levi, writer, journalist and TV anchorman
 Carlo Levi, writer, painter and physician
 Primo Levi, chemist and author
 Carlo Michelstaedter, philosopher
 Lisa Morpurgo Dordoni, writer, astrologer
 Paolo Mieli, journalist, historian and director of Corriere della Sera
 Liana Millu, writer
 Alberto Moravia (born Pincherle), author (Jewish father)
 Laura Orvieto, writer
 Alessandro Piperno, writer
 Umberto Saba, poet (Jewish mother)
 Donato Sacerdote, poet 
 Rubino Romeo Salmonì, writer
 Roberto Saviano, writer, journalist (Jewish mother)
 Clara Sereni, writer
 Italo Svevo (born Schmitz), author
 Humbert Wolfe, poet and civil servant
Aldo Zargani, writer

Artists
 Valeria Bruni Tedeschi, actress
 Vito D'Ancona, painter
 Cristiana Capotondi, actress (half Jewish)
 Gioele Dix (b. Davide Ottolenghi), actor and comedian
 Ginevra Elkann, film director, sister of John and Lapo
 Arnoldo Foà, actor
 Massimiliano Fuksas, architect (Jewish father)
 Vittorio Gassman, actor (Jewish mother)
 Alessandro Haber, actor
 Carlo Levi, writer, painter and physician
 Leo Lionni
 Emanuele Luzzati, painter
 Anna Magnani, actress (Jewish mother)
 Amedeo Modigliani, painter and sculptor
 Ernesto Nathan Rogers, architect, critic and editor
 Moni Ovadia, theatre figure
 Gillo Pontecorvo, director
 Xenia Rappoport, actress
 Bruno Zevi, architect

Business
 Carlo De Benedetti (born 1934), industrialist, ex-CEO of FIAT, Olivetti, CIR Group, ex-deputy chairman of Banco Ambrosiano and ex-president of Gruppo Editoriale L'Espresso
 John (born 1976) and Lapo Elkann (born 1977), Vice Chairman of Fiat (Jewish father)
 Adriano Goldschmied (born 1944), fashion designer known as the "godfather of denim" who created Diesel, Replay, and AG Adriano Goldschmied; currently directing Goldsign and men's Citizens of Humanity
 Moses Haim Montefiore (1784–1885), financier and philanthropist
 Adriano Olivetti (1901–1960), son of Camillo, industrialist and social activist
 Camillo Olivetti (1868–1943), founder of Olivetti typewriters
 Guy Spier (born 1966), author and investor

Other
 Eugenio Calò (1906–1944), Jewish partisan awarded the gold medal for military valour, murdered by the Nazis
 Angelo Donati (1885–1960), banker who protected Jews in Southern France during Italian occupation in 1942–43
 Mario Finzi (1913–1945), partisan (murdered in Auschwitz in 1945)
 Camila Giorgi (born 1991), tennis player
 Riccardo Ehrman (1929–2021), journalist
 Gad Lerner (born 1954), TV anchorman and journalist
 Gillo Pontecorvo (1919–2006), filmmaker
 Giorgio Liuzzi (1895–1983), Chief of the Staff of the Italian Army from 1954 to 1959
 Renato Mannheimer (born 1947), pollster, president of IPSO
 Maurizio Molinari (born 1964), journalist and essayist
 Edgardo Mortara (1851–1940), boy kidnapped by Catholic Papal authorities
 Fiamma Nirenstein (born 1945), essayist, journalist and MP for PDL (elected in 2008)
 Enzo Sereni (1905–1944), Zionist and partisan, executed in Dachau concentration camp

Luxembourg
 Hugo Gernsback, science-fiction pioneer (unconfirmed)
 Emil Hirsch, reform rabbi
 Gabriel Lippmann, French physicist (Luxembourg-born)
 Arno Joseph Mayer, historian

Monaco
 Franz Schreker, composer (Jewish father)

Netherlands

Scotland

Spain and Portugal

Switzerland
 Maurice Abravanel, conductor
 Jeff Agoos, US soccer international
 Ernest Bloch, composer
 Felix Bloch, physicist, Nobel Prize (1952)
 Alain de Botton, writer
 Albert Cohen, novelist
 Arthur Cohn, film producer
 Ruth Dreifuss, Swiss president (1999)
 Camille and Henri Dreyfus, inventors of Celanese
 Al Dubin, lyricist
 Jean Dunand-Gotscho, sculptor, painter, lacquerer
 Albert Einstein, physicist, Nobel Prize (1921)
 Edmond Fischer, biochemist, Nobel Prize (1992) (Jewish father)
 Robert Frank, photographer
 Meyer Guggenheim, businessman
 Jeanne Hersch, philosopher
 Frank Key, writer
 Mathilde Krim, AIDS researcher (convert)
 Dani Levy (born 1957), filmmaker, theatrical director and actor
 Rolf Liebermann, Swiss music administrator and composer
 Méret Oppenheim, surrealist artist
 Rachel, stage actress (Swiss-born)
 Tadeusz Reichstein, chemist, Nobel Prize (1950)
 Tibor Rosenbaum, rabbi and businessman
 Edmond Safra, banker
 Jean Starobinski, literary critic
 Sigismond Thalberg, pianist and composer
 Regina Ullmann, poet
 Charles Weissmann, biochemist
 Alain and Gérard Wertheimer, owners of Chanel

United Kingdom

Politicians 
John Bercow, Speaker of the House of Commons
Leon Brittan, Conservative Member of Parliament and Home Secretary
Benjamin Disraeli, British Conservative Prime Minister; converted to Anglicanism at age 12
Greville Janner, Labour Member of Parliament
Tim Judah, journalist and historian
Peter Mandelson, Labour Member of Parliament
David Miliband, politician, Labour Party (UK)
Ed Miliband (2005–present), Labour MP for Doncaster North and former Leader of the Labour party
Charlotte Nichols (2019–present) Labour MP for Warrington North
 Andrew Percy (2010–present), Conservative MP for Brigg and Goole
 Lucy Frazer (2015–present), Conservative MP for South East Cambridgeshire
 Ruth Smeeth (2015–2019), Labour MP for Stoke-on-Trent North
 Alex Sobel (2017–present), Labour MP for Leeds North West 
 Nicola Richards (2019–present), Conservative MP for West Bromwich East
 Ian Levy (2019–present), Conservative MP for Blyth Valley
 Dominic Raab (2010–present) Conservative MP for Esher and Walton

Actors 

 Tamsin Greig, actress and comedian 
 Tom Rosenthal, actor, comedian and writer
 Georgia Slowe, actress
 Sophie Okonedo, actress and singer
 Paul Kaye, actor and comedian
 Jason Isaacs, actor
 Helena Bonham Carter, actress
 David Baddiel, actor, comedian, writer and novelist 
 Rachel Weisz, actress
 Matt Lucas, actor, comedian and writer
 James Callis, actor
 Sacha Baron Cohen, actor, comedian, writer, director and film producer
 Edward Skrein, actor, rapper, film director and screenwriter
 Daniel Radcliffe, actor and producer
 Julian Morris, actor
 Aaron Taylor-Johnson, actor and screenwriter
 Gregg Sulkin, actor
 Isobel Powley, actress

Religious and communal leaders 

Elyakim Schlesinger, rabbi
 Danny Rich, Liberal rabbi
 Alexandra Wright, Liberal rabbi
 Isidor Grunfeld, Orthodox rabbi
 Miriam Berger, Reform rabbi

Other 

 Jacob Rothschild, banker

See also
 Lists of Jews
 List of Belgians
 List of Dutch people
 List of Irish people
 List of Luxembourgers
 List of Swiss people
 List of Iberian Jews
 List of British Jews
 History of the Jews in Scotland
 List of Scottish Jews
 List of Dutch Jews
 List of French Jews
 List of Austrian Jews
 List of Irish Jews

Notes
Of the 12 members of the 1928 Olympics Dutch Women's Gymnastics Teamthe first ever women's gymnastics gold medalistsfive were Jewish. All but Levie were murdered in the Holocaust.

Footnotes

Lists of Jews
 
Jews,West European